The men's Greco-Roman lightweight was a Greco-Roman wrestling event held as part of the Wrestling at the 1920 Summer Olympics programme. It was the third appearance of the event. Featherweight was the second lightest category, and included wrestlers weighing up to 67.5 kilograms.

A total of 22 wrestlers from 12 nations competed in the event, which was held from August 16 to August 20, 1920.

Results

Gold medal round

Silver medal round

Bronze medal rounds

References

External links
 
 

Wrestling at the 1920 Summer Olympics
Greco-Roman wrestling